Vartioitu kylä 1944 is a movie directed by Timo Linnasalo from 1978. The movie is based on the play Vartioitu kylä (1974) by Unto Heikura. The play was released June 20, 1974 in Kuhmo summer theater.

Story
The events take place on year 1944, in the end of World War II. Patrol man Jaakko Tulivaara (Timo Torikka) returns to his home for holiday, when killing people has damaged his mental state. His home village is guarded by a Finnish military group led by Sergeant Tolvanen (Antti Litja). In the village is also a wounded Soviet spy (Raimo Grönberg), whose family had moved from Finland to Russia a long time before the war. The spy happens to be a childhood friend of Tulivaara.

Critique
At its time, the movie was positively accepted. The script, content, cinematography, music and cast were liked. One problem of the movie are the flashbacks from the past. The movie was considered to be a nice novelty, later it was also mentioned to be one of the nicest first-direction-movies.

Cast

 Raimo Grönberg as  Janne Kyllönen, spy
 Markku Huhtamo as private Kumpulainen
 Kaija Kangas as Anna Keskitalo
 Antti Litja as sergeant Tolvanen
 Paavo Piskonen as private Kervinen
 Timo Torikka as Jaakko Tulivaara
 Markku Blomqvist as Jalo Vuokko
 Kauko Huusko as Heikki Keskitalo
 Kaarlo Karppanen as Kärnä old man
 Martti Kuningas as one-eyed soldier
 Mauno Kähkönen as Kalle Tulivaara
 Tuula Nyman as Ethel Paakinaho
 Taimi Haikonen as a woman in Keskitalo
 Marko Heikura as Alpo Tulivaara
 Marko Karppanen as Janne as a boy
 Eero Komulainen as Jaakko as a boy
 Teppo Korhonen as military policeman Kettunen
 Irja Leväsalmi as Kaisa Keskitalo
 Jouko Lumme as military policeman Malm
 Tuula Pulkkinen as Leena Tulivaara
 Matti Rahikainen as Janne's father
 Kaisu Haikonen as a girl in Keskitalo
 Yrjö Haverinen| as soldier
 Marja-Leena Heikkinen as a woman in Keskitalo
 Petri Heikkinen as a child in Keskitalo
 Pirre Heikkinen as a child in Keskitalo
 Saara Holopainen as old Reetta in Keskitalo
 Kauko Hyvärinen as news paper reading soldier
 Minna Häkli as young girl in Keskitalo
 Heikki Kallio (II) as White Guard soldier
 Kalevi Karhu as soldier
 Jari Kinnunen as young soldier
 Antero Kokkonen as White Guard patrol leader
 Kalle Kyllönen as soldier
 Kari Kyllönen as a villager in Keskitalo
 Pirkko Kyllönen as a villager Keskitalossa
 Pentti Lampinen as a soldier harassing Anna
 Pekka Litja as boy of Keskitalo
 Raimo Nyyssönen as young boy at Keskitalo
 Arttu Peltomaa as small child in Keskitalo
 Heikki Piirainen as a soldier telling dirty stories
 Martti Piirainen as drunk old Oman at the dance party
 Mauri Piirainen as White Guard soldier
 Annakaisa Pölönen as unidentified role
 Eira Pulkkinen as a woman in Keskitalo
 Maija Pääkkönen as a woman in the hay field
 Kaisu Rahikainen as Janne's mother
 Maarit Rahikainen as Janne's sister
 Mia Rahikainen as Janne's sister
 Minna Rahikainen as Janne's sister
 Outi Rahikainen as Janne's sister
 Mika Rytkönen as a child in Keskitalo
 Terttu Rytkönen as a woman in Keskitalo
 Matti Tervo as a child in Keskitalo
 Elina Peltomaa as a woman breast feeding a small child inside the house
 Vekku-dog as a dog

References

See also
Story description and reviews in newspapers Elonet.fi
Information about production Elonet.fi

1978 films
20th-century Finnish novels
Novels set during World War II
1970s war films
Finnish World War II films
1970s Finnish-language films